Hans Adu Sarpei (born 28 June 1976) is a Ghanaian former professional footballer who played as a full-back.

He also was a long time regular for the Ghana national team. Sarpei most recently played for his country at the 2010 FIFA World Cup in South Africa.

Club career
Sarpei was born in Tema. He was with VfL Wolfsburg for six seasons, where he extended his contract until 30 June 2007 in February 2004. He joined Wolfsburg in 2001 and made over 130 appearances for the Wolves. At the end of the 2006–07 Bundesliga season, then Wolfsburg manager Klaus Augenthaler decided not to renew Sarpei's contract.

On 18 May 2007, Sarpei moved to Bayer Leverkusen on a free transfer signing a two-year deal.

International career
Sarpei was a member of the Ghana national team. As such, he participated at the 2006 World Cup and the 2010 FIFA World Cup. He also received call-ups for the 2006 African Cup of Nations and the 2010 African Cup of Nations squads.

Media career
In 2016, it was announced that Sarpei would be a host on the Netflix reality show Ultimate Beastmaster.

Filmography
2015: 3 Türken und ein Baby (as Balthasar)

Personal life
Sarpei, who also has a German passport, moved to Germany from Ghana with his parents, when he was a child. His older brother, Edward, is a former Bundesliga player for 1. FC Köln, currently playing for BP Worringen.
Sarpei enjoys his large Facebook followership which recoined various Chuck Norris facts on him.

Honours
Schalke 04
DFB-Pokal: 2010–11

Ghana

 Africa Cup of Nations: runner-up 2010; third place: 2008

References

External links
  
 

Living people
1976 births
People from Tema
Naturalized citizens of Germany
German sportspeople of Ghanaian descent
Ghanaian footballers
German footballers
Association football defenders
Ghana international footballers
2006 FIFA World Cup players
2006 Africa Cup of Nations players
2008 Africa Cup of Nations players
2010 Africa Cup of Nations players
2010 FIFA World Cup players
Bundesliga players
2. Bundesliga players
SC Fortuna Köln players
FC Viktoria Köln players
MSV Duisburg players
VfL Wolfsburg players
VfL Wolfsburg II players
Bayer 04 Leverkusen players
Bayer 04 Leverkusen II players
FC Schalke 04 players
Ghanaian expatriate footballers
Ghanaian expatriate sportspeople in Germany
Expatriate footballers in Germany